The 2008–09 RBS Pentangular One Day Cup was the first edition of the Pentangular One Day Cup, a List A (limited overs) cricket tournament held in Pakistan. Five teams participated in the competition; four Pakistan provincial teams and one representing the capital. Punjab Stallions won the tournament by defeating Federal Areas Leopards in the final.

References

Domestic cricket competitions in 2008–09
2008 in Pakistani cricket
Cricket in Karachi
Cricket in Lahore
2008-09
December 2008 sports events in Asia